1199 was a common year starting on Friday of the Julian calendar.

1199 may also refer to:

 1199: The National Health Care Workers' Union
 1199SEIU United Healthcare Workers East
 SEIU Local 1199NE
 1199 Geldonia, an Eoan asteroid
 Ducati 1199, a sports bike introduced in 2011

See also 
 List of unions designated 1199
 German submarine U-1199